Jesús César Peláez Miranda (born 20 June 1940) is a Peruvian footballer. He played in four matches for the Peru national football team in 1963. He was also part of Peru's squad for the 1963 South American Championship.

References

External links
 

1940 births
Living people
Peruvian footballers
Peru international footballers
Place of birth missing (living people)
Association football forwards
Centro Iqueño footballers
Sporting Cristal footballers
C.D. Veracruz footballers
Peruvian Primera División players
Liga MX players
Peruvian expatriate footballers
Peruvian expatriate sportspeople in Mexico
Expatriate footballers in Mexico